Bothriochloa ischaemum is a species of perennial grass in the family Poaceae, found throughout much of the world. It is commonly known as yellow bluestem.  Two varieties are recognized, of which Bothriochloa ischaemum var. ischaemum is native to Europe, Asia, and Africa and naturalized elsewhere, and var. songarica is native to Asia and naturalized elsewhere. Var. songarica is an invasive weed in Texas, where it is known as "King Ranch bluestem"; it has displaced native grasses in large areas of central and south Texas.

The species name come from the Ancient Greek ischaemum, a styptic  (causing ischemia).

References

External links

 Grassbase - The World Online Grass Flora
 GBIF entry
 USDA Plants Profile entry Bothriochloa ischaemum var. ischaemum
 USDA Plants Profile entry Bothriochloa ischaemum var. songarica

ischaemum
Plants described in 1936
Grasses of Africa
Flora of Asia
Flora of Europe